The 19th Directors Guild of America Awards, honoring the outstanding directorial achievements in film and television in 1966, were presented in 1967.

Winners and nominees

Film

Television

External links
 

Directors Guild of America Awards
1966 film awards
1966 television awards
Direct
Direct
1966 awards in the United States